The 5th Army Corps was an Army corps in the Imperial Russian Army.

Composition
7th Infantry Division
10th Infantry Division

Part of
5th Army: 1914–1915
12th Army: 1915
10th Army: 1915
2nd Army: 1915–1916
11th Army: 1916
8th Army: 1916
11th Army: 1917

Commanders
 1905: Nikolai Vonlyarlyarsky
 1909: Nikolai Schutlewort
 1911-1913: Alexander Litvinov
 1914-1917: Pyotr Baluyev

References 

Corps of the Russian Empire
Military units and formations established in 1877
Military units and formations disestablished in 1918
1877 establishments in the Russian Empire